Bossa may refer to:

 Bossa nova, a genre of music originating from Brazil, similar to a mix of samba and jazz

People
 Francesco Bossa (born 1990) Italian soccer player
 José Ferreira Bossa (1894-1970) Portuguese colonial governor
 Solomy Balungi Bossa (born 1956) Ugandan judge

Companies
 Bossa Studios, UK videogame developer
 Bossa (company), Turkish textile company

See also

 
 Bossa nova (disambiguation)
 Blue Bossa (disambiguation)